Vincentina (minor planet designation: 366 Vincentina) is a fairly large main belt asteroid.

Vincentina was discovered on 21 March 1893 by Auguste Charlois, and named after Vincenzo Cerulli, an Italian astronomer.

References 

The Asteroid Orbital Elements Database
Minor Planet Discovery Circumstances
Asteroid Albedo Compilation

External links
 
 

Background asteroids
Vincentina
Vincentina
Ch-type asteroids (SMASS)
18930321